The Nun and the Harlequin (German: Die Nonne und der Harlekin) is a 1918 German silent drama film directed by Alfred Halm and starring Frederic Zelnik, Lya Mara, and Paul Bildt.

Cast
 Frederic Zelnik
 Lya Mara
 Paul Bildt
 Heinrich Schroth
 Hermann Vallentin

References

Bibliography
 Bock, Hans-Michael & Bergfelder, Tim. The Concise CineGraph. Encyclopedia of German Cinema. Berghahn Books, 2009.

External links
 

1918 films
Films of the German Empire
German silent feature films
Films directed by Alfred Halm
1910s German films